Jerusalem Walls may refer to:

Walls of Jerusalem, the city walls of Jerusalem
Jerusalem Walls National Park, also called Jerusalem Walls-City of David National Park
Walls of Jerusalem National Park, Tasmania, Australia